Manolita Cinco Dopeno (born 1932) is a Filipino hurdler. She competed in the women's 80 metres hurdles at the 1956 Summer Olympics. She was the first woman to represent the Philippines at the Olympics. She is married to Alejo Dopeno. Later in her life, she was diagnosed with breast cancer but survived it.

References

External links
 

1932 births
Living people
Athletes (track and field) at the 1956 Summer Olympics
Filipino female hurdlers
Olympic track and field athletes of the Philippines
Place of birth missing (living people)
Asian Games medalists in athletics (track and field)
Asian Games bronze medalists for the Philippines
Athletes (track and field) at the 1954 Asian Games
Athletes (track and field) at the 1958 Asian Games
Medalists at the 1954 Asian Games
Medalists at the 1958 Asian Games